The Sharecroppers' Union, also known as SCU or Alabama Sharecroppers’ Union, was a trade union of predominantly African American tenant farmers (commonly referred to as sharecroppers) in the American South that operated from 1931 to 1936. Its aims were to improve wages and working conditions for sharecroppers.

History 
Founded in 1931 in Tallapoosa County, Alabama, the Sharecroppers' Union had its origins in the Croppers’ and Farm Workers’ Union (CFWU). It was founded with the support of the Communist Party USA and, although theoretically open to all races, its membership by 1933 was solely African-American. Among its first members was Ned Cobb, whose story was told in Theodore Rosengarten’s All God's Dangers: The Life of Nate Shaw.

SCU's initial demands included continuation of food advances, which had been suspended by landowners in an attempt to drive down wages; the ASU also demanded the right to sell surplus crops directly in the market rather than having to rely on brokerage by the landowners. They demanded also the right to cultivate small garden plots in order to minimize dependency on the landowners for food. In addition to the demand for payments to be made in cash rather than in goods, SCU membership also demanded nine-month public elementary schools for their children.

In 1935, the SCU turned its attention to the Federal government. Subsidies which were provided by the New Deals' 1933 Agricultural Adjustment Act (AAA) benefited only the landowners and the SCU sued the Federal government for direct payment to sharecroppers. The AAA was declared unconstitutional in 1936 and the case was subsequently dropped.

By 1935, membership had reached 5,000; by 1936, membership had nearly doubled to 10,000. However, in October of that year the Communist Party, desirous of promoting a more popular-frontist bloc with Democrats in the South, withdrew its support of SCU, resulting in the dissolution of the SCU as it merged first into the Farmers' Union of Alabama and then into the Alabama Agricultural Workers' Union.

See also 
Southern Tenant Farmers Union
Sharecropping

References 

Agriculture and forestry trade unions in the United States
History of agriculture in the United States
Trade unions established in 1931
Politics of the Southern United States
Agricultural organizations based in the United States
Labor relations in Alabama